Broadview is a village in Cook County, Illinois,  west of downtown Chicago. As of the 2020 census it had a population of 7,998.

History
Broadview was incorporated as a village in 1914.

Government 
 Mayor: Katrina Thompson
 Clerk: Kevin R. McGrier
 Trustees: Judy Miller, Judy Abraham, Patti Chao-Malave, Andrea Senior, and Jarry Shelby

Geography
Broadview is located in Proviso Township along the western edge of Cook County, at  (41.859439, -87.854226).

Demographics
As of the 2020 census there were 7,998 people, 3,009 households, and 1,768 families residing in the village. The racial makeup of the village was 71.31% African American, 11.49% White,  2.16% Asian, 0.68% Native American, 8.24% from other races, and 6.13% from two or more races. Hispanic or Latino of any race were 15.32% of the population.

There were 3,009 households, out of which 45.10% had children under the age of 18 living with them, 34.56% were married couples living together, 17.91% had a female householder with no husband present, and 41.24% were non-families. 37.06% of all households were made up of individuals, and 20.80% had someone living alone who was 65 years of age or older. The average household size was 3.38 and the average family size was 2.55.

The village's age distribution consisted of 21.0% under the age of 18, 4.6% from 18 to 24, 25.4% from 25 to 44, 29.7% from 45 to 64, and 19.3% who were 65 years of age or older. The median age was 44.1 years. For every 100 females, there were 104.4 males. For every 100 females age 18 and over, there were 91.1 males.

The median income for a household in the village was $54,537, and the median income for a family was $80,000. Males had a median income of $40,955 versus $40,028 for females. The per capita income for the village was $29,155. About 5.4% of families and 7.6% of the population were below the poverty line, including 13.6% of those under age 18 and 13.2% of those age 65 or over.

Note: the US Census treats Hispanic/Latino as an ethnic category. This table excludes Latinos from the racial categories and assigns them to a separate category. Hispanics/Latinos can be of any race.

Education
Maywood-Melrose Park, district 89 and E.F. Lindop school district 92 operates elementary and middle schools.

Proviso Township High Schools District 209 operates public high schools. Portions of Broadview are served by Proviso East High School in Maywood and portions are served by Proviso West High School in Hillside. Broadview residents may apply to Proviso Math & Science Academy in Forest Park.

Government
Broadview is located in the 7th Congressional District

Economy
Broadview is home to Mullins Food Products, Vanee Foods, Bosch, Perlow Steel, Windy City Limo, The Furniture Guys and Garda Security Services. Within the Broadview Village Square, various big box retailers are located such as Target and Home Depot.

Notable people
 Lee Stange, professional baseball player who grew up in Broadview.

References

External links
 Village of Broadview official website
 Broadview Suburban Life news

Villages in Illinois
Chicago metropolitan area
Villages in Cook County, Illinois
Populated places established in 1914
1914 establishments in Illinois
Majority-minority cities and towns in Cook County, Illinois